Doyle Samuel Dotson III is the Chief of Police for the Amtrak Police Department. He was previously St Louis' Police Commissioner from 2013 to 2017.

Early life and education
Dotson is a 1987 graduate of Metro Academic and Classical High School. He earned a Bachelor of Arts in Management from Webster University and a Masters in Business Administration from Fontbonne University. He is a graduate of the Senior Management Institute for Police.

Career
Dotson joined the Metropolitan Police Department, City of St. Louis on October 11, 1993; he was assigned to the Fourth District. In 2001, he was promoted to sergeant where he served in the office of the Chief and the Ninth District. In 2007, he was promoted to lieutenant where he served in the office of the Chief. In 2008, he was promoted to captain where he served in the office of the Chief, the Seventh District, and the Board of Police Commissioners. Prior to being named Police Commissioner, he served as the city's operations director.

He became St. Louis' 34th Police Commissioner on December 14, 2012. In 2016 he stood for Mayor of St. Louis. 
He resigned as Police Commissioner on April 17, 2017, when Lyda Krewson became Mayor. After that he worked as Director of Security for the Washington Nationals baseball team, before being appointed in October 2018 as assistant chief of police for Amtrak.

Personal and family life
Dotson disclosed that for years he had been estranged from his mother, who in 2018 was convicted for theft of over $2 million from a real estate company.

References

1969 births
Commissioners of the St. Louis Metropolitan Police Department
Amtrak people
Webster University alumni
Fontbonne University alumni
Living people